Mohammad Samimi (born 29 March 1987 in Shahrekord) is an Iranian discus thrower.

He is the younger brother of Abbas Samimi and the older brother of Mahmoud Samimi.

Competition record

References

1987 births
Living people
Iranian male discus throwers
Asian Games silver medalists for Iran
Asian Games medalists in athletics (track and field)
Athletes (track and field) at the 2010 Asian Games
Athletes (track and field) at the 2014 Asian Games
Medalists at the 2010 Asian Games
Universiade medalists in athletics (track and field)
Universiade gold medalists for Iran
Medalists at the 2009 Summer Universiade
Islamic Solidarity Games medalists in athletics
Islamic Solidarity Games competitors for Iran